Janko Veselinović (13 May 1862 – 26 June 1905) was a Serbian writer.

Biography
Janko Veselinović was born in Crnobarski Salaši on 1 May 1862 in Eastern Orthodox priestly family. He completed elementary school in Šabac in 1878 and enrolled into teacher's college in Belgrade from which he dropped out. Je worked as a teacher between 1880 and 1882 as well as between 1886 and 1889. From 1893 he worked as an assistant for the Srpske novine newspaper editor. As an enemy of the regime he lost ohis job in 1899-1900 and he was arrested on three separate occasions in 1888, 1899 and 1903). He died on 19 June 1905.

Works
 Pastoral: Stories from Rural Life (Сељанка: приповетке из сеоског живота), novel 1888
 Pictures of Rural Life (Слике из сеоског живота), story, 2 volumes, 1886–88
 Wild Flowers (Пољско цвеће), story, 1890–1891
 Paradise of the Soul (Рајске душе), story, 1893
 Stari poznavitsi (Стари познавици), story, 1891–96
 Hajduk Stanko (Хајдук Станко), novel, 1896
 Fighters (Борци), stories
 Letters from the Village (Писма са села), stories
 Complete works (Целокупна дела) 9 volumes
 The Flute Player, story
 Poteru, play (in collaboration with Čiča Ilija Stanojević), 1895

References 

 The factual material for the Wikipedia biography of Janko Veselinović (writer) is adapted from the Serbian of Jovan Skerlić's Istorija Nove Srpske Književnosti / A History of New Serbian Literature (Belgrade 1914, 1921), pages 384–390.
 Also, adapted from Serbian Wikipedia: Јанко Веселиновић
 Gerda Baudisch: The patriarchal village in the narrative work of Janko M. Veselinović (Das patriarchale Dorf im Erzählwerk von Janko M. Veselinović), Munich, 1969

Serbian novelists
1862 births
1905 deaths
Serbian male short story writers
Serbian short story writers
19th-century novelists
19th-century short story writers